Thomas J. Lewis House is a historic home located at Roann, Wabash County, Indiana.  It was built about 1903, and is a -story, Queen Anne style frame dwelling. It sits on a stone and brick foundation and has a hipped roof with gabled dormers. It features a full-width front porch and two-story bay. Also on the property are the contributing cistern and windmill frame.

It was listed on the National Register of Historic Places in 2006.  It is located in the Roann Historic District.

References

Houses on the National Register of Historic Places in Indiana
Queen Anne architecture in Indiana
Houses completed in 1903
Buildings and structures in Wabash County, Indiana
National Register of Historic Places in Wabash County, Indiana
1903 establishments in Indiana